Rahman "Rock" Harper  (born December 17, 1976) is an American chef, television personality and restaurateur who won in the third season of the Gordon Ramsay-presented reality television show Hell's Kitchen.

Biography
Harper discovered his love of cooking in his early teens and earned a culinary degree at Johnson & Wales University (JWU).

Harper has held positions at Café Calliope, Burke Station Restaurant, Planet Hollywood, and BET on Jazz Restaurant, and was executive chef at B. Smith's Restaurant prior to joining in the third season of the Fox reality-television show Hell's Kitchen in 2007. After his win on Hell's Kitchen where he accepted the prize of a high-salaried stint as head chef at the Terre Verde Restaurant at Green Valley Ranch Resort, he became the National Celebrity Chef for the March of Dimes. After his year at Terra Verde he then worked as the executive chef of Ben's Next Door and The Carlyle Club. 

Harper later became an instructor at Stratford University. In 2010, he published the book 44 Things Parents Should Know about Healthy Cooking for Kids.

In 2013, Harper appeared on Chef Wanted with Anne Burrell and won the executive chef position at The Precinct, a steakhouse in Cincinnati, Ohio; however, he did not ultimately accept the job.

In 2020, Harper opened Queen Mother’s Fried Chicken inside Ghostline in Washington, DC as a tribute to his mother, Carole Harper. One year later, the restaurant was relocated to The Kitchen of Purpose in Arlington, Virginia. The restaurant is known for duck-fat brined fried chicken that was featured on TV shows such as Hell’s Kitchen and Sherri.

Awards 
In 2020 and 2021, Queen Mother’s was nominated as a RAMMY Award finalist presented by Restaurant Association of Metropolitan Washington (RAMW) in the category of “Hottest New Sandwich Shop.” The Annual RAMMY Awards honors the hard-working individuals and organizations and restaurants in Washington DC's foodservice community. 

In 2023, Harper was a semifinalist for a James Beard Award in the category of “Best Chef – Mid Atlantic.” The James Beard Awards honors talent in the culinary and food media industries. The awards demonstrates commitment to racial and gender equity, community, sustainability, and a culture equal for all to thrive.

Charity work 
 March of Dimes - National Celebrity Chef
 DC Central Kitchen - Board Member 
DC Greens - Board of Directors
Global Food and Drink Initiative: Board of Directors

Filmography

Television

References 

 

1976 births
Living people
American chefs
American male chefs
Reality cooking competition winners
Participants in American reality television series
Johnson & Wales University alumni